Covestro AG is a German company which produces a variety of polyurethane and polycarbonate based raw materials. Products include isocyanates and polyols for cellular foams, thermoplastic polyurethane and polycarbonate pellets, as well as polyurethane based additives used in the formulation of coatings and adhesives.  It is a Bayer spin off formed in the fall of 2015 and was formerly called Bayer MaterialScience, Bayer's materials science division.

Covestro shares were first offered on the Frankfurt Stock Exchange in October 2015.  Bayer sold its entire remaining stake in May 2018, Bayer's pension fund had a 6.8% stake managed separately.

The main industries served are automotive manufacturing and supply, electrical engineering and electronics, construction and home products, and sports and leisure. Their products include coatings and adhesives, polyurethanes that are used in thermal insulation, electrical housings, and as a component of footwear and mattresses, and polycarbonates such as Covestro's Makrolon, which are highly impact-resistant plastics.  Covestro polyurethane was used in the 2014 official FIFA World Cup football. Before 2019, Covestro enjoyed rapid earnings growth following supply shortages of chemicals used in foams.

Financials

In 2015, the company netted USD revenues of $13.46B, net income of $382M and an operating margin of 5.1%. In 2018, the company's revenues were $16.29B, net income of $2B, and operating margin of 15.5%.

In Q1 of 2019, a drop in revenue and net income was seen, with revenues down at $3.54B compared to 2018's Q1 of $4.21B, a 16% drop. Q2 2019 revenues also saw a 16.9% drop from Q2 2018's $4.3B to $3.58B. Likewise with Net income, Q2 2019 also dropped from Q2 2018's $672M to $210M.

Among the 3 key segments of the company, Polyurethanes (PUs), Polycarbonates (PCs), and Coatings/Adhesives/Specialties, Polyurethanes experienced 70.5% drop in EBITDA Q2 2019 compared to Q2 2018 due to needing to drop prices from increased supply and competition. Revenues dropped from $2.19B to $1.66B in Q2 2019 as a result. The next biggest drop in key segments was Polycarbonates from revenues $1.18B to $1B Q2 2019 over past year. The price drop of PUs and PCs were -26.8% and -18.8% respectively. According to the report, demand drop of the auto industry led to a drop in volumes for PCs while construction and electronics industries grew.

See also
 Linde Group
 Bayer
 BASF
 Lanxess
 Viverso

References

External links 
 

Chemical companies of Germany
Chemical companies established in 2015
Companies based in North Rhine-Westphalia
Companies listed on the Frankfurt Stock Exchange
Corporate spin-offs
Former Bayer subsidiaries
German companies established in 2015
Materials science organizations
2015 initial public offerings